The Ecological Party for the Development of Burkina is a political party in Burkina Faso (former Upper Volta) founded in 2003.

The president of the PEDB is Yacouba Touré.  The party is a member of the Federation of Green Parties of Africa/Partis Verts de la Fédération en Afrique.

Green parties in Africa
Political parties in Burkina Faso
Global Greens member parties